Charles "Sparky" McEwen (born April 28, 1968) is an American football coach and former player.  He is the head football coach at Davenport University.  McEwen played professionally as a quarterback  for one season with the Grand Rapids Rampage of the Arena Football League (AFL). He played college football at Ferris State University and attended Creston High School in Grand Rapids, Michigan. He was also head coach of the Grand Rapids Rampage and Oklahoma City Yard Dawgz.

College career
McEwen played for the Ferris State Bulldogs from 1987 to 1990. He was redshirted in 1987. He played quarterback for the Bulldogs from 1988 to 1989. McEwen recorded 2,183 career yards and 17 touchdowns on 155 of 297 pass attempts. He converted to wide receiver in 1990, recording 18 receptions for 259 yards and one touchdown.

Professional career
McEwen played for the Grand Rapids Rampage of the AFL in 1998, appearing in five games and recording four touchdowns on 477 passing yards. He had a 2–1 record as a starting quarterback.

Coaching career
McEwen was head coach of the Creston High School Polar Bears of Grand Rapids, Michigan from 1996 to 2003. The Polar Bears won three City League titles from 2000 to 2002. In 1999, he helped the Polar Bears to the team’s first winning season since 1978 as well as the school’s first appearance in the state championship game.

McEwen first served as an offensive assistant and scout for the Grand Rapids Rampage in 2000. McEwen was later offensive coordinator for the Rampage from 2001 to 2003. He was assistant head coach and offensive coordinator for the Oklahoma City Yard Dawgz of the af2 in 2004. He was head coach and director of football operations for the Grand Rapids Rampage from 2005 to 2007. The Rampage attained a record of 13–35 during his tenure. McEwen was head coach of the Oklahoma City Yard Dawgz from 2008 to 2010. The Yard Dawgz were promoted to the AFL in 2010 and finished the season with a 6–10 record.

McEwen became wide receivers coach of the Ferris State Bulldogs in 2012. In February 2017, he was named the head coach of the Davenport Panthers of Davenport University.

Head coaching record

Arena Football League

Arena Football 2

Note: McEwen took over after six games after Gary Reasons resigned, the Yard Dawgz finished 6–10 overall.

College

References

External links
 Davenport profile
 Just Sports Stats - Playing record
 Just Sports Stats - Coaching record

1968 births
Living people
American football quarterbacks
American football wide receivers
Davenport Panthers football coaches
Ferris State Bulldogs football coaches
Ferris State Bulldogs football players
Grand Rapids Rampage players
Grand Rapids Rampage coaches
Oklahoma City Yard Dawgz coaches
High school football coaches in Michigan
Sportspeople from Grand Rapids, Michigan
Players of American football from Grand Rapids, Michigan
African-American players of American football
African-American coaches of American football
21st-century African-American people
20th-century African-American sportspeople